Kincorth House is a  Category B listed 18th-century manor house, near Forres, Moray, in Scotland.

History
The Murray of Culbin family held the lands in the 13th century.

A medieval chapel, once existed nearby, that was dedicated to St Ninian. There are no remains above ground of the chapel.

References

External links
Kincorth House website

Category B listed buildings in Moray